CBS High School Clonmel (Ardscoil na mBráithre), is a second level Christian Brothers school in Clonmel, County Tipperary in Ireland. 
It was built in 1899 and its first Superior was Joseph White. A new school building was first occupied in 1971. By 1985, it had a student population of 550 and 31 staff. 
There are now over 40 staff and 800 students.

Sports

Gaelic games 
The school competes in the Dr. Harty Cup in hurling and the Corn Uí Mhuirí in Gaelic Football. In 2011, they were the All-Ireland B Post Primary School Gaelic football champions and went on to reach the Corn Uí Mhuirí final in 2016. The school produced a number of All-Ireland Minor Football Championship winners for Tipperary GAA in 2011, including 2016 all star Michael Quinlivan. In recent years, former students have represented Tipperary & Waterford minor, under 21 & senior hurling & football teams with Mark Kehoe winning minor, under 21 & senior titles with Tipperary.

Rugby

The High School played its first rugby match in 1994 against the Central Technical Institute Clonmel. The school won its first Munster title in 2004 defeating Intermediate School Killorglin in the U19 O'Brien Cup final played in Clonmel RFC. In 2005 the High School won its second Munster title defeating St. Clements in the U16 King Cup final played in Bruff RFC. The High School now fields U14, U15, U16 and U19 rugby teams competing in the U15 McCarthy and Cleary Cups, the U16 Mungret Shield and Junior Cup, and the U19 Mungret Cup and Senior Cup. The High School has won the Cleary Cup on several occasions and won back to back Mungret Shield titles in 2019 and 2022. The High School qualified for the Munster Schools Senior Cup in 2019 and 2020. The school qualified for the Munster Schools Junior Cup in 2019 and 2022. Since 2005 the High School has offered a Rugby and French Scholarship to one of its students to attend a rugby camp in France during the summer holidays. In 2022 the High School completed construction of a World Rugby standard 4G pitch on its campus. High School teams also play their home matches at Clonmel RFC's pitches in Ard Gaoithe. High School students are regularly selected for Munster U16 and U18 representative squads. Dave Foley graduated from the High School in 2006 and went on to play for Munster and Ireland.

Other sports 

The school is also plays soccer (association football) and rugby. One of the rugby highlights for the school was winning the U-15 Cleary cup

Controversy 
The school was accused of discrimination in 2011 when a traveller was refused entry into the school due to the admissions policy which gave preference to students who had relations as past pupils.

The case went as far as the Supreme Court of Ireland where they  "ruled the evidence and materials put before the Circuit Court and the Equality Tribunal was insufficient to enable it make a proper assessment whether John was particularly disadvantaged due to the fact neither his father nor another sibling had attended the school."

Notable alumni
Dave Foley
Babs Keating
Jason Lonergan
Vivian Murray

References

External links
 Official school website

Education in County Tipperary
Congregation of Christian Brothers secondary schools in the Republic of Ireland
Secondary schools in County Tipperary
1899 establishments in Ireland
Educational institutions established in 1899